Magudanchavadi block is a revenue block in the Salem district of Tamil Nadu, India.

References

Revenue blocks of Salem district